Tashiana Washington is an American singer, film and television actress. Washington is best known for her role in the award-winning film Gimme the Loot as well as a role in the movie Shaft.

Washington was born and raised in Queens, New York. In 2013, she starred in Gimme the Loot, for which she received a 2014 Black Reel nomination for Outstanding Breakthrough Actress Performance. Complex magazine named Washington one of the 25 Breakout Actresses to Know in 2013.

Filmography

Film

Television

References

External links 
 
 

1990s births
Living people
Actresses from New York City
21st-century American women